Abdul Jabiri Marombwa (born 25 November 1959) is a Tanzanian CCM politician and Member of Parliament for Kibiti constituency since 2005, and re-elected 2010.

References

1959 births
Living people
Chama Cha Mapinduzi MPs
Tanzanian MPs 2010–2015
University of Dar es Salaam alumni
Open University of Tanzania alumni